Sundar Rao Nadkarni was an Indian film actor, editor, cinematographer, producer and director. He was the director of the first hit film for AVM productions  Bhookails in Telugu in the year 1940, and later the record-creating Tamil film Haridas.

Early life 

Sundar Rao Nadkarni was born in Mangalore in a Konkani speaking family. He started his career in Bangalore as an actor in silent films produced by Surya Films. Later, he moved to Bombay where he took to film direction and editing. Nadkarni caught the eye of film producer Avichi Meiyappa Chettiar who, after the success of Sabhapathy, was looking to make another comedy film. Thereon, he moved to Coimbatore and finally Madras, where he settled down permanently.

In 1942, Nadkarni directed the Tamil film En Manaivi which was a hit. Following this success, Nadkarni also made other successful Tamil films. But his greatest hit was the 1944 film Haridas which set a record by becoming the first Tamil film to run for 110 weeks at a single theatre. He directed all the top Tamil actors during his active years, notably M. K. Thyagaraja Bhagavathar and T. R. Rajakumari in Haridas (1944), Narsimha Bharathi in Krishna Vijayam (1950), and MGR and Savitri in Mahadevi (1957).

Filmography

As director

References 

 

Tamil film directors
Mangaloreans
Year of birth missing
Konkani people
Indian silent film directors
20th-century Indian film directors
Telugu film directors
Kannada film directors